"Soroode Zan" is a song by Iranian singer and composer Mehdi Yarrahi. Composed by Yarrahi and written by Mona Borzouei, it is a protest song with musical composition of anthem style, released eighteen days after the Death of Mahsa Amini —which sparked a massive global protests all around the world— inspired by her death and its aftermath. Beginning with the "Woman, Life, Freedom" slogan, in the lyrics, the narrators are calling everyone to join them in the Mahsa Amini protests.

The song was highly acclaimed by the Mahsa Amini protesters and was used many times as a protest anthem in the demonstrations, including on October 11, 2022, during the strikes the song was performed by the students of Tehran Art University, creating the word "blood" with the students shaping themselves.

Although all the music platforms are banned in Iran and there isn't any copyright law, the song has 792 thousand streams on Spotify, 424 thousand views on YouTube, 259 thousand streams on Soundcloud and thousands of views and streams on other platforms, uploaded by unknown people illegally.

Background and release

Background 

The song was inspired by the death of Mahsa Amini, who was arrested for alleged wearing her Hijab improperly and later died after according to eyewitnesses, she had been severely beaten by religious morality police officers. Amini's death sparked massive global protests and became a symbol for freedom in Iran. The "Woman, Life, Freedom" slogan —which the song starts with— became a rallying cry during the Mahsa Amini protests.

Release 

After the death of Mahsa Amini on September 16, 2022, and the start of the protests, many Iranian artists started releasing protest songs inspired by her death. Yarrahi released "Soroode Zan" on October 4, —eighteen days after the death of Mahsa Amini— through all of his platforms, without mentioning the name of the lyricist. Following Borzouei's arrest by the authorities on September 22, and her release on bail eight days later, she tweeted about her arrest. Yarrahi later retweeted Borzouei's tweet and thanked her for her work as the lyricist of the song.

Composition and lyrics

Composition 
"Soroode Zan" is written by Borzouei and composed by Yarrahi. It is a protest song with musical composition of anthem style.

Lyrics 
The song first starts with a 12-second voice of Wolves howling and then it has two parts, an intro and a verse. The intro consist of six "Woman, Life Freedom" slogans, shouted by men and women. The women's voice are clearer, showing that they are leading the protests (referring to the Initial Mahsa Amini protests which mostly were led by women).  

The second part is sang by Yarrahi, female and male guest choirs and some times, all together. The verse starts with the sentence "In the Name of You, That is our code word" that refers to the inscription on Amini's tombstone that later was used as a slogan in the protests:In the second sentence, the song is making a reference to Neda Agha-Soltan, which after getting killed by Basij paramilitary forces for peacefully joining the protests in the 2009 Iranian election protests, she became a symbol for freedom in Iran. Nedā (ندا) means "voice" or "calling", the narrators in the song are calling everyone to join them in the Mahsa Amini protests.  

In the verse the female guest choirs are addressing the men's role in the protests, who are like a "Trench warfare" for women and making a tribute to them. In return the male guest choirs and Yarrahi are saying "In-lieu-of them, beat my heart!", assuring the women of the men's role, to make them join the protests. The male guest choirs and Yarrahi also make a tribute to the women's bravery in the protests —which according to the statistics and the videos that went viral in the first days of the protests, the women were at the front line of the demonstrations— by saying "Hairs put up, What a tremendous sense of awe!", referring to the protester Hadis Najafi, which after she got killed —by reportedly getting shot at least six times in the face, hand, neck, abdomen and heart— a video purporting to show her tying her hair into a ponytail before joining the protests on her last night alive became viral on social media, making Najafi a symbol of repression in Iran.

By saying "Why immigrate? Stay and take back!", the narrators are criticizing the Human capital flight from Iran crisis, which due to the long history of Human rights violations by the Islamic Republic of Iran, Iran has the world's highest rate of brain drain, with every year more than 150,000 educated young people leaving the country.

Commercial performance 
As of February 3, 2023, the song has about 424,000 views on YouTube.

As of February 3, 2023, the song has about 792,000 streams on Spotify.

As of February 3, 2023, the song has about 259,000 streams on Soundcloud.

Credits and personnel 
Credits adapted from Yarrahi's Spotify account and his tweet thanking Borzouei for her work as the lyricist of the song.

 Mehdi Yarrahi – vocals, composer
 Mona Borzouei – lyricist

See also 

 For
 O Iran!
 Human rights in the Islamic Republic of Iran

References

fa:سرود زن

Iranian music
Protest songs